Wilfried Achiel Emma Martens (19 April 1936 – 9 October 2013) was a Belgian politician who served as prime minister of Belgium from 1979 to 1981 and from 1981 to 1992. A member of the Flemish Christian People's Party, during his premiership he oversaw the transformation of Belgium into a federal state. He was one of the founders of the European People's Party.

Early life
Martens was born on 19 April 1936 in the village of Sleidinge, East Flanders, the son of small farmers. He studied law at the Catholic University of Leuven, graduating in 1960. Martens became active in the Flemish Movement as a student. He began to draw public attention in 1957 when, as president of the Flemish Youth Committee, he organized a march to protest the lack of Flemish presence in the 1958 Brussels World's Fair, and was subsequently arrested while protesting the opening of the exposition.

Political career 

In 1965, Martens joined the Christian People's Party (now the Christian Democratic and Flemish party). He served as the party's chairman from 1972 to 1979, sitting as a deputy in the Chamber of Representatives from 1974 to 1991, and serving as a Senator from 1991 to 1994.

Wilfried Martens served as Prime Minister in nine coalition governments (Martens I-IX) from 3 April 1979 to 6 April 1981 and 17 December 1981 to 7 March 1992. His period in office was dominated by the economic crisis of the 1980s and the state reforms of 1980 and 1988 which set Belgium on a path to federalism.

He co-founded the European People's Party (EPP) in 1976 and was EPP President from 1992 until his death.

From 1993 he was President of the European Union of Christian Democrats (EUCD), until its merger with the EPP in 1996. Martens also negotiated with Finnish politician Sauli Niinistö the merger of the European Democrat Union (EDU) into the EPP (formally concluded in 2002). The successful fusion of all centre-right European organisations into the EPP – currently the largest transnational European political party with 75 member-parties from 40 countries – is widely recognised as an important achievement of his European political legacy.

From 1994 to 1998, he was a Member of the European Parliament, chairing the EPP Group.

From October 2000 to November 2001 he was also the President of the Christian Democrat International (CDI).

He re-appeared on the Belgian political stage on 22 December 2008 to help in the 2007–2011 Belgian political crisis.

Martens held a doctorate in law, a degree in notarial studies, as well as a baccalaureate in Thomistic philosophy from the Catholic University of Louvain. He also studied international political science at Harvard University. He practised law at the Ghent court of appeal.

Among numerous national and international distinctions, he was honoured in 1998 with the Charles V European Award for his contribution to European integration.

Private life 
Martens had five children: two from his first marriage with Lieve Verschroeven (Kris and Anne) and three with Ilse Schouteden (Sarah, Sophie and Simon). After the birth of their twins in 1997 they married on 13 November 1998. Ilse Schouteden has a son from her previous marriage. In 2007 he divorced his second wife. On 27 September 2008 he married Miet Smet, a former Belgian minister. It was his third marriage and her first. After the death of his first wife, Martens was able to celebrate the marriage to Miet Smet in the Catholic Church, on 27 April 2013.

Death and tributes 

Martens suffered from pancreatic cancer and ended his life via euthanasia on the 9th of October, 2013 at his home in Lokeren; he was 77. Elio Di Rupo, the Belgian prime minister, described him as a "true statesman and one of the fathers of federal Belgium". Martin Schulz, president of the European Parliament, paid tribute to him as a "statesman of Belgium, Europe and an outstanding leader of European Parliament". Jerzy Buzek, EPP MEP and former prime minister of Poland, described him as "irreplaceable". He received a state funeral he was buried in the cemetery of Campo Santo.

The EPP think tank Centre for European Studies has been renamed after him, now being the "Wilfried Martens Centre for European Studies", a decision taken during the EPP Congress in Dublin held on 9 March 2014.

Honours 
 : 
 Minister of State, by Royal Decree.
 Grand officer in the Order of Leopold
 Grand Cross in the Order of Leopold II
 Grand Cross in the Order of the Crown

Foreign honours 
 :Grand Decoration of Honour in Gold, Decoration of Honour for Services to the Republic of Austria (30 May 1985)
 : 
 Knight Grand Cross in the  National Order of Merit (28 February 1983)
 Grand Officer in the Legion of Honour.
 : Knight Grand Cross in the Order of Merit of the Federal Republic of Germany (7 February 1984)
 : Knight Grand Cross in the Order of the Phoenix
  : Knight Grand Cross of the Order of the Falcon (16 October 1979)
 : Grand Cross of the Order of Merit of the Italian Republic (20 February 1986)
 :"Banda" of the Order of the Aztec Eagle (14 June 1985)
 :
 Grand Cross of the Order of Christ (10 December 1982)
 Grand Cross in the Order of Prince Henry (31 October 1987)
 : Knight Grand Cross in the Order of Isabella the Catholic (March 1980)
 :Knight Grand Cross in the Order of Orange-Nassau.
 : Knight Grand Cross in the Order of the Oak Crown (20 June 1984)
 Grand Officer in the Ordre du Croissant vert, Commores (9 June 1982)

See also 
 Pierre Carette
 Wilfried Martens Centre for European Studies

Publications 

 Een gegeven woord, Lannoo, Tielt, 1985.
 Europa voorbij Oost en West, Lannoo, Tielt, 1995.
 De Memoires, Luctor et Emergo, Lannoo, Tielt, 2006.
 Europe: I Struggle, I Overcome, Springer Science+Business Media, 2009.

References

Further reading 
 Wilsford, David, ed. Political leaders of contemporary Western Europe: a biographical dictionary (Greenwood, 1995) pp. 306–13.

External links 

 epp.eu
 Wilfried Martens in ODIS - Online Database for Intermediary Structures 

|-

|-

|-

|-

1936 births
2013 deaths
Prime Ministers of Belgium
Belgian Ministers of State
Belgian Roman Catholics
Deaths from cancer in Belgium
Deaths by euthanasia
Catholic University of Leuven (1834–1968) alumni
Christian Democratic and Flemish politicians
Deaths from pancreatic cancer
Flemish activists
Flemish politicians
European People's Party MEPs
MEPs for Belgium 1994–1999
People from Evergem
Presidents of the European People's Party

Grand Crosses of the Order of the Crown (Belgium)
Recipients of the Grand Cross of the Order of Leopold II
Knights Grand Cross of the Order of the Falcon
Knights Grand Cross of the Order of Merit of the Italian Republic
Grand Crosses 1st class of the Order of Merit of the Federal Republic of Germany